Stara Gora pri Velikem Gabru is a small settlement in the hills north of Veliki Gaber in the historical region of Lower Carniola in Slovenia. It belongs to the Municipality of Šmartno pri Litiji. The municipality is included in the Central Slovenia Statistical Region.

Name
The name of the settlement was changed from Stara Gora to Stara Gora pri Velikem Gabru in 1953.

References

External links
Stara Gora pri Velikem Gabru at Geopedia

Populated places in the Municipality of Šmartno pri Litiji